The Episcopal Diocese of Nevada is the diocese of the Episcopal Church in the USA comprising the entire State of Nevada.  The eleventh and current bishop of the Diocese, The Rt. Rev. Elizabeth Bonforte Gardner, was ordained and consecrated by Presiding Bishop Michael Curry at Christ Church Episcopal in Las Vegas on March 5, 2022. On October 8, 2021, the Reverend Gardner was elected bishop of the Episcopal Diocese of Nevada.

The cathedral in this diocese is Trinity Episcopal Cathedral, and is located in Reno. It was designated in December 2016.

In 1971, Nevada achieved separate diocesan status. Under the leadership of diocesan bishop Wesley Frensdorff, who served from 1972 to 1985, Nevada became a leader in the concept of Total Ministry, the "ministry of all the baptized," in which laity and clergy have a more equal share in ministry.

The ninth bishop of Nevada, the Right Reverend Katharine Jefferts Schori, was elected the 26th Presiding Bishop of the Episcopal Church at the 2006 General Convention, becoming the first female primate in the Anglican Communion.

The Diocese works to be faithfully engaged in civic society with people of all faiths through Nevadans for the Common Good, Clergy and Laity United for Economic Justice, the Nevada Faith and Justice Alliance, Communities in Schools, All Our Children, Bread for the World and other groups working for justice and mercy.

Bishops
These are the bishops who have served the region now known as the state of Nevada:

Bishops 
 Joseph Cruickshank Talbot, Missionary, Northwest Diocese (1860 - 1869)
 Ozi William Whitaker, Missionary, Nevada and Arizona, (1869 - 1886)
 Abiel Leonard, Missionary, Utah and Nevada, (1888 - 1903)
 Henry Douglas Robinson (1908 - 1913)
 George Coolidge Hunting (1914 - 1924)
 Thomas Jenkins (1929 - 1942)
 William F. Lewis (1942 - 1959)
 William Godsell Wright (1960-1972)
 Wesley Frensdorff (1972 - 1985)
 Stewart Clark Zabriskie (1986 - 1999)
 Katharine Jefferts Schori (2001 - 2006)* Jerry A. Lamb, Assisting (2007)
 Dan Thomas Edwards (2008 - 2018)*James Edward Waggoner, Assisting (2018-2022)
Elizabeth Bonfort Gardner (2022 - current)

See also
 Katharine Jefferts Schori, 26th Presiding Bishop
 Succession list of Episcopal bishops
 Total Ministry

References

External links

 
Journal of the Annual Convocation of the Missionary District of Nevada

Nevada
 
Christianity in Nevada
Christian organizations established in 1971
Province 8 of the Episcopal Church (United States)
1971 establishments in Nevada